Benk is a village in Szabolcs-Szatmár-Bereg county, in the Northern Great Plain region of eastern Hungary.

Geography

References

External links
http://www.citypopulation.de/php/hungary-szabolcsszatmarbereg.php?cityid=25441

Benk